The Carnosaur film series consists of B-movies produced by Roger Corman that feature genetically engineered dinosaurs running amok in various scenarios. The series started with the first Carnosaur film, released in 1993, that was loosely based on the 1984 novel Carnosaur by John Brosnan. Two sequels were released direct-to-video: Carnosaur 2 in 1995, and Carnosaur 3: Primal Species in 1996.

Two subsequent films use footage from the Carnosaur films: Raptor (2001) and The Eden Formula (2006).

Carnosaur trilogy

Carnosaur (1993)

Carnosaur was written and directed by Adam Simon, and was released to theaters on May 14, 1993. The film is loosely based on the 1984 novel Carnosaur by John Brosnan. In the film, Dr. Jane Tiptree (Diane Ladd), a mad scientist specializing in agricultural genetic engineering, uses chickens from the plant she works at to breed dinosaurs. She also creates a virus containing dinosaur DNA that will impregnate women with dinosaurs and kill them after birth, so the animals can wreak havoc and exterminate humanity, which she believes needs to be destroyed so that the dinosaurs can rule the planet once again. An alcoholic security guard and an environmental activist attempt to stop her and the dinosaurs, and the military is later sent in to kill the town residents and quarantine the virus. The film was a modest box-office success, reportedly grossing $1,753,979, despite a limited theatrical release.

Carnosaur 2 (1995)

Directed by Louis Morneau and written by Michael Palmer, Carnosaur 2 was released direct-to-video in February 1995. Starring John Savage and Cliff DeYoung, the film features a group of technicians called in to investigate the power shortage at a top-secret mining facility, only to discover it is actually a remote nuclear dump site where the government transported the dinosaurs from the first film. The dinosaurs have overrun the facility, and now the technicians must try to survive while avoiding a radiation leak and trying to keep the dinosaurs from escaping the facility.

Carnosaur 3: Primal Species (1996)

Released direct-to-video in November 1996, Carnosaur 3: Primal Species was directed by Jonathan Winfrey and starred Scott Valentine and Janet Gunn. The film involves a group of terrorists who attempt to steal a large shipment of uranium, but instead realize that they have seized a truckload of cloned dinosaurs, which escape. A military team is then sent to contain the creatures.

Other films

Raptor (2001)

Raptor was directed by Jim Wynorski and was released direct-to-video on November 6, 2001. It re-uses dinosaur footage from the three Carnosaur films and cuts them together with new footage shot by Wynorski. The film was created through Roger Corman's company New Concorde, which had worked on the Carnosaur films. The film focuses on a small town sheriff (Eric Roberts) and an animal control officer (Melissa Brasselle) investigating a series of deaths by genetically engineered dinosaurs that escape from a nearby laboratory (mainly Velociraptors), while also dealing with their creator Dr. Hyde (Corbin Bernsen).

The Eden Formula (2006)

The Eden Formula was written and directed by John Carl Buechler, who worked on the dinosaur effects for the Carnosaur trilogy. The film includes recycled footage from the trilogy combined with new footage. The film was originally released on DVD in Australia, before getting a U.S. DVD release in 2007. Starring Jeff Fahey, Tony Todd and Dee Wallace, the plot revolves around a group of spies who accidentally release a cloned Tyrannosaurus onto the streets of Los Angeles.

References

Horror film series
American natural horror films
Films about dinosaurs
American monster movies
American splatter films
Giant monster films
Films about genetic engineering
English-language films
Action film series